Membrane progesterone receptor alpha (mPRα), or progestin and adipoQ receptor 7 (PAQR7), is a protein that in humans is encoded by the PAQR7 gene.

See also
 Membrane progesterone receptor
 Progestin and adipoQ receptor

References

7TM receptors